Henri Pouzère (born 1943) is a Central African politician and lawyer. He was appointed to the government of the Central African Republic as Minister of Posts and Telecommunications in 2013.

Political career
Pouzère ran in both the September 1999 and March 2005 presidential elections as an independent candidate, receiving 4.19% of the vote in 1999 and 2.10% in 2005. In the concurrent 2005 parliamentary election, he also ran for a seat in the National Assembly from Ippy, but was defeated by Yvonne Ndjapou.

As of 2007, Pouzère was coordinator of the Union of the Active Forces of the Nation (UFVN) opposition coalition.

Following a rebellion in December 2012, a national unity government was appointed on 3 February 2013, composed of supporters of President François Bozizé, the opposition, and rebels. Pouzère was appointed to the government as Minister of Posts, Telecommunications, and New Technologies. After Bozizé was ousted by the rebels in March 2013, Pouzère was retained as Minister of Posts and Telecommunications in the next government, appointed on 31 March 2013.

References

1943 births
Living people
Central African Republic lawyers
People from Ouaka
Government ministers of the Central African Republic